Motleb bin Abdullah bin Motleb bin Mohammed AL-Nafisah (born 1937) is the minister of state and secretary general of the Supreme Council for Petroleum and Minerals of Saudi Arabia.

Early life and education 
He was born in Riyadh Alkhabra in Qassim in 1937. He holds a bachelor's degree in law from the University of Cairo, Egypt in 1962. Nafisah received master's degree in law from Harvard University, Massachusetts in 1971 and PhD in law from the same university in 1975.

Government Positions

Minister of State and a member of the Saudi Council of Ministers (1995–present)
Legal adviser in the Saudi Council of Ministers (1382–1962)
Chairman of the Panel of Experts Assembly Minister (1975–1995)
Secretary General and member of the Supreme Council for Petroleum and Mineral Affairs
Supreme Economic Council
Board of Civil Service
Board of Military Service
Deputy Director General of the Institute of Public Administration

Participated in studies of all four systems:
Cabinet system
Judicial system
Trade regulations
Financial system
Supreme Committee for the preparation of the Basic Law
Supreme Committee for the preparation of the Shura Council
Supreme Committee for the preparation of system areas
Ministerial Committee supervising the project, King Abdullah to develop public education
Ministerial Committee for Administrative Organization

References

External links

20th-century Saudi Arabian politicians
1937 births
Living people
Harvard Law School alumni
Cairo University alumni
Government ministers of Saudi Arabia